Perry Lopez (born Julio César Lopez; July 22, 1929 – February 14, 2008) was an American film and television actor.  His acting career spanned 40 years.

Biography
Lopez was born in New York City of Puerto Rican descent. Lopez began his acting career in theater, based in New York. He was signed to a contract at Warner Bros. Studios in 1954, his first appearance being Bogus Charlie in Drum Beat. Lopez appeared as Spanish Joe in Battle Cry (1955), as Rodrigues in Mister Roberts in 1955, then had the leading role in The Steel Jungle (1956) and appeared as Toro in Cry Tough in 1959. He also played in a number of  B-movies and Westerns early on in his career, including the Creature from the Black Lagoon (1954), The Young Guns (1956) and The Lone Ranger.

Although he was part of the supporting cast in Mister Roberts, his role was prominent – he played opposite Henry Fonda and James Cagney, who were both established stars at the time. However, he was perhaps best known as Lieutenant Lou Escobar in the 1974 film Chinatown, which he starred in opposite Jack Nicholson and Faye Dunaway. He reprised the role sixteen years later (with Escobar promoted to Captain) in The Two Jakes in 1990. Also right before this time he starred opposite Charles Bronson playing drug gang leader Ed Zacharias in 1987's Death Wish 4: The Crackdown.

Among his many television appearances, one of his more well-known roles is that of Esteban Rodriguez in the Star Trek episode "Shore Leave". Lopez also appeared in an episode of Bonanza, as the cold-blooded outlaw Duke Miller, who kills a man over being first in line to get a haircut. He was Joaquín Castañeda, a mestizo that fought to free his people, on Zorro, starring Guy Williams. Lopez also appeared in episode 14, "Night Of The Long Knives" originally airing December 16, 1966 of The Time Tunnel television series; the Voyage to the Bottom of the Sea episode "Savage Jungle"; McLintock! (1963) as Davey Elk; the Juan Moreno's Body as a migrant Mexican fruit picker accused of murdering the son of the owner of the orchard; and Kelly's Heroes (1970) as Pvt. Petuko.

Death
Lopez died of lung cancer at The Rehabilitation Centre of Beverly Hills in Beverly Grove, Los Angeles, at age 78. He was survived by several nieces and nephews. His ashes were interred at Hollywood Forever Cemetery.

Filmography 
 1954 Jubilee Trail as Silva's Son (uncredited)
 1954 Creature from the Black Lagoon as Tomas (uncredited)
 1954 Drum Beat as Charlie "Bogus Charlie"
 1955 Battle Cry as Private Joe "Spanish Joe" Gomez
 1955 Mister Roberts as Rodrigues
 1955 The McConnell Story as "Red" (uncredited)
 1955 I Died a Thousand Times as Louis Mendoza
 1956 Hell on Frisco Bay as Mario Amato
 1956 The Lone Ranger as Pete Ramirez
 1956 The Steel Jungle as Ed Novak
 1956 The Young Guns as San Antone
 1957 Omar Khayyam as Prince Ahmud
 1958 The Deep Six as Al Mendoza
 1958 Violent Road as Manuelo
 1959 Cry Tough as Toro
 1960 Flaming Star as Two Moons
 1961 Man-Trap as Puerco
 1962 Taras Bulba as Ostap Bulba
 1963 McLintock! as Davey Elk
 1966 The Rare Breed as Juan
 1968 Sol Madrid as Hood
 1968 Daring Game as Reuben
 1968 Bandolero! as Frisco
 1969 Che! as Rolando
 1970 Kelly's Heroes as Petuko
 1973 Lady Ice as Carlos
 1974 Chinatown as Lieutenant Lou Escobar
 1987 Death Wish 4: The Crackdown as Ed Zacharias
 1989 Kinjite: Forbidden Subjects as Detective Eddie Rios
 1990 The Two Jakes as Captain Lou Escobar
 1994 Confessions of a Hitman as Priest (final film role)

References

External links

Perry Lopez at Memory Alpha, a Star Trek wiki
Perry Lopez Obit at Variety via Internet Archive

1929 births
2008 deaths
American male film actors
American male television actors
American people of Puerto Rican descent
Deaths from lung cancer in California
Male actors from New York City
Warner Bros. contract players
20th-century American male actors
Burials at Hollywood Forever Cemetery